The Artistic Skating World Championships ('Worlds') is an annual artistic roller skating competition sanctioned by World Skate (previously the International Roller Sports Federation; FIRS) in which elite figure skaters compete for the title of World Champion. First held in 1946, the event is regarded the most prestigious of the sport and a world title is considered to be the highest competitive achievement in artistic skating. Skaters compete in many different categories such as men's singles, ladies singles, pairs, and junior categories at the World Championships.

Due to the 2022 Russian invasion of Ukraine, World Skate banned Russian and Belarusian athletes and officials from its competitions, and will not stage any events in Russia or Belarus in 2022.

Medalists

Senior Men's Combined (1947–2014)

Senior Men's Figures

Senior Ladies Figures

Senior Men's Freeskating

Senior Ladies Freeskating

Senior Men's Solo Dance

Senior Ladies Solo Dance

Senior Pairs

Senior Couple Dance

Senior Men Inline

Senior Women Inline

See also
 International Roller Sports Federation

References

World Championships
Artistic
Recurring sporting events established in 2002